Stadnitsa is a rural locality (a selo) and the administrative center of Stadnitskoye Rural Settlement, Semiluksky District, Voronezh Oblast, Russia. The population was 456 as of 2010. There are 10 streets.

Geography 
Stadnitsa is located on the right bank of the Serebryanka River, 44 km northwest of Semiluki (the district's administrative centre) by road. Kondrashyovka is the nearest rural locality.

References 

Rural localities in Semiluksky District